My Three Angels is a comedy play by Samuel and Bella Spewack. The play is based on the French play La Cuisine Des Anges by Albert Husson, and is their only play that is regularly performed in repertory theater.

Production
The production opened on Broadway at the Morosco Theatre on March 11, 1953, and closed on January 2, 1954 after 344 performances. The play was directed by Jose Ferrer, with Scenic Design by Boris Aronson and costumes by Lucinda Ballard.

The play is set in French Guiana around the turn of the 20th century, showing the interaction between three prisoners and a family of French colonists.

Original Broadway cast 
Walter Slezak as Joseph 	 
Joan Chandler as Marie Louise Ducotel 	  
Jerome Cowan as Jules 	  
Henry Daniell as Henri Trochard 	  
Carmen Mathews as Emilie Ducotel 	  
Robert Carroll as Paul 	 
Eric Fleming as Lieutenant 	 
Will Kuluva as Felix Ducotel 	 
Nan McFarland as Mme. Parole 	 
Darren McGavin as Alfred

Films 
The 1955 movie We're No Angels was based upon My Three Angels. The original play is fairly similar to the film, but the main difference is that in the play the three prisoners are not escapees; they are working on the warden's house with repairs.

The play was adapted for Australian TV in 1962.

The 1989 movie We're No Angels, starring Robert De Niro, Sean Penn, and Demi Moore uses elements of the core story as well. So does the 1993 movie Ore-tachi wa tenshi janai 俺達は天使じゃない by Takashi Miike, starring Ren Ōsugi, Junji Inagawa and Makiko Kuno.

References

External links
My Three Angels at the Internet Broadway Database
Coronado Playhouse production

American plays adapted into films
Plays based on other plays
1953 plays